Bjarne Fjærtoft (7 November 1899  –  28 August 1981) is a Norwegian politician for the Liberal Party.

He was born in Jondal.

He was elected to the Norwegian Parliament from Møre og Romsdal in 1954, and was re-elected on one occasion.

Fjærtoft held various positions in Ålesund city council from 1947 to 1955, serving as mayor in 1950–1951.

Outside politics he worked as a jurist, most notably as stipendiary magistrate (byfogd) in from 1946 to 1969, having graduated as cand.jur. in 1924. He was also involved in the local fish trade.

References

1899 births
1981 deaths
Liberal Party (Norway) politicians
Members of the Storting
Mayors of places in Møre og Romsdal
Politicians from Ålesund
Norwegian jurists
Jondal
20th-century Norwegian politicians